Siegfried Friedrich Wilhelm Erdmann Graf von Roedern (born 27 July 1870 in Marburg, died 14 April 1954 in Bergen, Upper Bavaria), was a German politician. He served as Secretary in the Ministry for Alsace-Lorraine from 1914 to 1916, and as Secretary for the Treasury and Minister of State (1916–1918).

A member of a noble Prussian family, he studied law in Freiburg, Berlin, Geneva and Marburg and became a lawyer in 1893. For most of his career, he was a civil servant.

Literature 
 Claudia Wilke: Die Landräte der Kreise Teltow und Niederbarnim im Kaiserreich: Eine biographisch-verwaltungsgeschichtliche Studie zur Leistungsverwaltung in der Provinz Brandenburg. Verlag für Berlin-Brandenburg, Potsdam 1998, .
 Rudolf Vierhaus: Deutsche biographische Enzyklopädie (dbe)

External links
 

Finance ministers of Germany
1870 births
1954 deaths
Prussian nobility
Counts of Germany
Nazi Party members
SS personnel